Mustafa Jaffer Sabodo was born in Lindi, Tanzania to parents of Indian descent. He is an economist, consultant in international debt-finance, and a businessman. He has business interests in India, France, Kenya, Sudan and Zimbabwe.

In 2003, he offered to finance the growing of pulse for export to the tune of TSh 100 million.

The Mwalimu Nyerere Foundation National Lottery was the brainchild of Sabodo, who donated TSh 800 million towards a project that established the lottery.

References

Tanzanian businesspeople
Year of birth missing (living people)
Living people
People from Lindi
Tanzanian Muslims
Tanzanian people of Indian descent